Andranomiady is a town and commune in Madagascar. It belongs to the district of Faratsiho, which is a part of Vakinankaratra Region. The population of the commune was estimated to be approximately 6,000 in 2001 commune census.

Only primary schooling is available. The majority 97% of the population of the commune are farmers, while an additional 2% receives their livelihood from raising livestock. The most important crop are potatoes, while other important products are beans and maize. Services provide employment for 1% of the population.

References and notes 

Populated places in Vakinankaratra